Mauro Galetti. is a Brazilian ecologist and conservation biologist. He is a full professor in the Department of Biodiversity  at the Universidade Estadual Paulista, Rio Claro, São Paulo and has worked at Stanford University (USA), Aarhus University (Denmark) and the University of Miami (USA). He also holds a position as a Courtesy Associated Professor at Florida International University, Miami, FL.  Galetti's work has centered on the analysis of the ecological and evolutionary consequences of defaunation. He was awarded by WWF in 1998 and was a Tinker Fellow at Stanford University and a visiting professor at Aarhus Universitet, Denmark in 2017.

Early life and education
Galetti was born in Campinas, São Paulo during the Military regime in Brazil. Grandson of a Portuguese immigrant from Madeira Island and son of Physics teacher, Galetti was always influenced by his brother Marcos Rodrigues and his uncle Pedro Manoel Galetti Jr. who are both biologists. He grew up in Campinas, São Paulo until the age of 25 when he moved to University of Cambridge for earning the Doctor of Philosophy.  Galetti is an alumni member of Robinson College. During his childhood, he studied in a suburban school until his parents moved him to Imaculada Coração de Maria a prestigious private school. He enrolled in the Biology course at Universidade Estadual de Campinas in 1986. Since his early days in the university, he notice that most classes were uninteresting to him so he decided to spend most of his mornings in the forest fragment nearby Mata de Santa Genebra, Campinas, São Paulo. There he starts observing and studying howler monkeys, squirrels, and other fruit-eating animals. His first project was to follow a group of howler monkeys from dusk to dawn, but because howlers spend most of their time sleeping, he decided to also study other frugivores in the forest. In the University, he was inspired by his former professors and naturalists Ivan Sazima, Keith Brown, Wesley R. Silva. His former Master supervisor Leonor Patricia Cerdeira Morellato to study deep the interactions between fruits and frugivores in this forest. The small forest fragment near the university was his major laboratory where he spent most of his mornings watching birds and mammals eating fruits.

In 1988, Galetti attended a talk by the Mexican ecologist Rodolfo Dirzo, who present for the first time his ideas about the impact of defaunation on plant communities.  This talk influence him for the rest of his career.

Galetti's enrolled in the Master's program at Universidade Estadual de Campinas in 1990 and by August 1992 (after 18 months) he received a Master's in Science diploma and moved to Cambridge in September 1992. From 1992 to 1996, he was enrolled in the Wildlife Research Group at Cambridge University, UK.

Career
Galetti got his Ph.D. at University of Cambridge in 1996. In Cambridge, Galetti's was supervised by the primatologist David J. Chivers. At this time Galetti met a young primatologist Carlos A. Peres who influence him to study keystone species instead of primates. He decides to test the concept of keystone species in tropical forests for the first time, comparing the abundance of fruit-eating birds and mammals in areas with a dense population of palms Euterpe edulis with neighbor sites without palms. During their last year in Cambridge he spend a week in Seville with Pedro Jordano which changed his life. Jordano was a young scientist expert in frugivory and seed dispersal who took Galetti to Sierra de Cazorla and teach him about the Mediterranean ecosystems. Before coming back to Brazil, Galetti's moved to Barito Ulu project in Kalimantan, Indonesia. He decided to spend a year studying for the first time seed dispersal by hornbills and sunbears, but after 3 months, a civil war irrupted in Indonesia and he decided to return to Brazil. He was one of the first ecologists to study toucans and hornbills in the wild.

After four months in Borneo, he moved back to Brazil and became a professor at Universidade Estadual Paulista in 1998 where he works at the Department of Biodiversity. He was a visiting scientist at Consejo Superior de Investigaciones Cientificas in Seville in 2007 and Thinker Professor at Stanford University from 2008 to 2009 at Center for Latin American Studies. During his period in Stanford, he was associated with Professor Rodolfo Dirzo, the father of defaunation ideas. 

In 2017 he was Visiting Faculty at Aarhus Universitet, Denmark where he collaborated intensively with Dr. Jens-Christian Svenning. From 2020 to 2022 he was an associate professor at the University of Miami, FL, USA, and is a courtesy Associated Professor at Florida International University. 

Galetti was the pioneer in publishing about rewilding, particularly after visiting Kruger National Park in South Africa. They realized that most of the Brazilian cerrado is a Pleistocene megafauna defaunated ecosystem.

Galetti has written on ecology for a number of journals including Science, PLOS ONE and Biological Conservation  and his contribution has been much debated by public media. Galetti has published more than 220 papers in was the Editor of Biological Conservation for Latin America 

In 2013, his paper  was Highly Recommended by the Faculty of 1000.
In 2019, 2020, 2021, 2022 he was considered one of the top 1% of most influential scientists in the world Clarivate Analytics.

Selected publications 
Dirzo, R., H. S. Young, M. Galetti, G. Ceballos, N. J. B. Isaac, and B. Collen. 2014. Defaunation in the Anthropocene. Science 345:401-406.

Galetti, M., R. Guevara, M. C. Cortes, R. Fadini, S. Von Matter, A. B. Leite, F. Labecca, T. Ribeiro, C. S. Carvalho, R. G. Collevatti, M. M. Pires, P. R. Guimaraes, P. H. Brancalion, M. C. Ribeiro, and P. Jordano. 2013. Functional Extinction of Birds Drives Rapid Evolutionary Changes in Seed Size. Science 340:1086-1090.

Galetti, M., E. Eizirik, B. Beisiegel, K. Ferraz, S. Cavalcanti, A. C. Srbek-Araujo, P. Crawshaw, A. Paviolo, P. M. Galetti, Jr., M. L. Jorge, J. Marinho-Filho, U. Vercillo, and R. Morato. 2013. Atlantic Rainforest's Jaguars in Decline. Science 342:930-930.

Galetti, M. and R. Dirzo. 2013. Ecological and evolutionary consequences of living in a defaunated world. Biological Conservation 163:1-6.

Bueno, R. S., R. Guevara, M. C. Ribeiro, L. Culot, F. S. Bufalo, and M. Galetti. 2013. Functional Redundancy and Complementarities of Seed Dispersal by the Last Neotropical Megafrugivores. PLoS ONE 8:e56252.

Hansen, D. M. and M. Galetti. 2009. The forgotten megafauna. Science 324:42-43.

Galetti, M., H. C. Giacomini, R. S. Bueno, C. S. S. Bernardo, R. M. Marques, R. S. Bovendorp, C. E. Steffler, P. Rubim, S. K. Gobbo, C. I. Donatti, R. A. Begotti, F. Meirelles, R. d. A. Nobre, A. G. Chiarello, and C. A. Peres. 2009. Priority areas for the conservation of Atlantic forest large mammals. Biological Conservation 142:1229-1241.

Honors and awards
World Wide Fund for Nature (1998)
 Most influential scientists (2019)
 Most influential scientists (2020)
 Most influential scientists (2021)
 Most influential scientists (2022)

References

Interview with Dr. Galetti - Terra da Gente

External links
 Programa de Pós-graduação em Ecologia e Biodiversidade, UNESP, Brazil

Brazilian scientists
Rewilding advocates
People from Campinas
Brazilian biologists
Brazilian ecologists
Living people
1967 births